Titletown High is a Netflix reality show that explores the lives of teens at Valdosta High School in Valdosta, Georgia as they strive for a balance between athletics, academics, and relationships. It focuses on the members of the school's Valdosta Wildcats football team during the 2020 season, their first under the leadership of head coach Rush Propst.

The show became available to stream on August 27, 2021.

Episodes

See also 
 Two-A-Days

References

External links
 
 

2021 American television series debuts
2020s American high school television series
Television series about teenagers